Manolis Pappas (born 1951), is a former Greek footballer (midfielder). He was a member of the Panachaiki football team that qualified for the 1974 UEFA Cup.

He started his career in Ethnikos Piraeus before being transferred to Panachaiki in the 1969–70 season. He played in Patras until the 1975–76 season.

Statistics
Manolis Pappas had 189 First Division appearances for Panachaiki and scored 11 goals.

References

Rsssf, website about football statistics.

Notes 

Panachaiki F.C. players
Ethnikos Piraeus F.C. players
Greek footballers
1951 births
Living people
Association football midfielders